Umar Makharbekovich Karsanov (born 30 December 1981) is a former Russian professional footballer.

He made his debut in the Russian Premier League in 2001 for FC Alania Vladikavkaz.

References

1981 births
Sportspeople from Vladikavkaz
Living people
Russian footballers
Association football midfielders
FC Spartak Vladikavkaz players
FC KAMAZ Naberezhnye Chelny players
Russian Premier League players
FC Orenburg players